Eric Reginald Lubbock, 4th Baron Avebury (29 September 1928 – 14 February 2016), was an English politician and human rights campaigner. He served as the Liberal Member of Parliament for Orpington from 1962 to 1970. He then served in the House of Lords, having inherited the title of Baron Avebury in 1971, until his death. In 1999, when most hereditary peers were removed from the House of Lords, he was elected by his fellow Liberal Democrats to remain. When he died, he was the longest serving Liberal Democrat peer.

Early life and career
A descendant of William Lubbock (1701–1754), he was the son of Maurice Fox Pitt Lubbock (the sixth son of John Lubbock, 1st Baron Avebury) and Mary Katherine Adelaide Stanley, daughter of Arthur Stanley, 5th Baron Stanley of Alderley.

Lubbock was educated at Upper Canada College, an all-boys private school in Toronto, Canada, and at Harrow School, an all-boys public school in London. He read Engineering Science at Balliol College, Oxford.

He served as a Lieutenant in the Welsh Guards and joined Rolls-Royce in 1951. At the company, he was employed as a production manager (1951–1956) and as a production engineer (1956–1960).

Parliamentary career
Having joined the Liberal Party in 1960 and become a councillor the following year, Lubbock stood as his party's candidate at the Orpington by-election on 15 March 1962, and gained the seat with a majority of 7,855, a swing of nearly 22% from the Conservatives. At the time, the victory was seen as a revival of the Liberal Party, and brought the number of Liberal MPs to seven. Lubbock was dubbed "Orpington Man". However, the party did not make the anticipated recovery. It was hampered by organisational difficulties, and progress was slow, with a loss of votes and seats during the period of Harold Wilson's Labour government.

Lubbock held Orpington in 1964 and 1966, both times against Guinness World Records founder Norris McWhirter. "When I beat McWhirter for the second time in 1966", Lubbock said in 2015, "he said at the count that he now realised that the people in Orpington were only interested in their back gardens. And I was very pleased by that because it confirmed my attempts to look after people's local concerns."

As the MP for Orpington, Lubbock was appointed Chief Whip by Jo Grimond in 1963, a post he held until 1970. When Grimond resigned as party leader in 1967, Lubbock was one of the three Liberal MPs who stood for the position. Jeremy Thorpe won the contest with six votes, with Emlyn Hooson and Lubbock getting three apiece.

As the only Liberal on the Speaker's Conference on Electoral Reform from 1963 to 1965, he attempted to reduce the voting age to 18 and to introduce the Single Transferable Vote system of Proportional Representation for general elections.

Lubbock initiated the Caravan Sites Act 1968 as a Private member's bill, which mandated that councils assess and provide for the needs of Gypsy, Roma and Traveller people passing through their boroughs, in order to provide unused land for them to camp on. 324 sites were created in all, but many councils "delayed, minimized or completely avoided provision of the sites for Gypsies in England." The perceived ineffectiveness of the Act led to its repeal by the Conservative government in 1994.

In the Commons, Lubbock was on the Speaker's Commission on Electoral Law (1964–1966), and proposed STV in multi-member constituencies, only to be voted down by 18–1. He also proposed reducing the voting age to 18, and two Labour Members supported him. Orpington reverted to being a Conservative seat at the 1970 general election. On losing the seat Lubbock said, "In 1962 the wise, far-seeing people of Orpington elected me as their Member; in 1970 the fools threw me out".

The following year, John Lubbock, 3rd Baron Avebury, died without a male heir and Eric Lubbock, his cousin, succeeded him. As Baron Avebury, he sat on the Royal Commission on Standards of Conduct in Public Life (1974–1976), and was Liberal Spokesman on Immigration and Race Relations (1971–1983). Throughout his time in politics he was involved in human rights activism, both in and beyond Parliament. In 1976, he founded the Parliamentary Human Rights Group, which he chaired for the next 21 years. He continued as Vice-Chair after standing down.

In 1974, Avebury was asked by Liberal leader Jeremy Thorpe to lead the Liberal general election campaign that year.

In 1987, as a jocular protest against the cost of cremation, he offered to leave his body to Battersea dogs home "to vary the inmates' diet." Bill Wadman-Taylor, manager of the home, said: "I am sure there is a lot of nutritional value in the noble Lord and the dogs are not fussy, but we just couldn't do it." On being advised that the dogs would probably accept but the home's management wouldn't, he made the same offer to the cats.

He was a member of the Liberal Democrat Foreign Affairs Team, speaking on conflict resolution and human rights.

Human rights 
In a 2014 Huffington Post article, Avebury noted that "When I founded the Parliamentary Human Rights group in 1976, I hoped to work with recently independent countries to promote the UN's treaties on civil and political rights." He chaired the group until 1997 and served as Vice-chair until his death, along with the Labour MP and former leader, Jeremy Corbyn. Following Avebury's death, Corbyn described him as a "Great friend, brave and determined human rights campaigner who dedicated his life to rights of all."

Avebury was a keen advocate of human rights and the separation of church and state. He was as a patron of the British Humanist Association and an honorary associate of the National Secular Society, which awarded him Secularist of the Year 2009 for his role alongside Evan Harris in the abolition of blasphemous libel. In September 2010, Avebury, along with 54 other public figures, signed an open letter for the British Humanist Association in The Guardian, stating their opposition to Pope Benedict XVI's state visit to the UK.Avebury visited Eastern Turkey, Syria and Iraq during the 1990s on fact-finding missions to investigate human rights abuses against the Kurdish minority groups in those countries. Subsequent reports published by the Parliamentary Human Rights Group resulted in a ten-year ban from entering Turkey. He was also banned from entering Kashmir and East Timor.

While banned from Turkey, Avebury campaigned against the involvement of UK construction company Balfour Beatty in the Ilisu Dam project in Turkey's Kurdish region, appearing on the Mark Thomas Comedy Product in 2001 to talk about the issue. In another episode of Thomas' series, he described Avebury as "the one Lord of any use and relevance" when describing how they met at a House of Lords meeting on Kurdish rights in Turkey.

He was President of the Peru Support Group, campaigning on human rights issues in Peru, and a Patron of Peace Brigades International, meeting with South American human rights defenders and raising their cases in Parliament. He was a Patron of Prisoners Abroad, a charity that supports the welfare of Britons imprisoned overseas and their families. Lord Avebury was a Co-Chair of the CHT (Chittagong Hill Tracts) Commission, which monitors the implementation of the CHT Peace Accord by the Bangladesh Government, and a member of the All Party Parliamentary Humanist Group.

He frequently raised matters related to British nationality law in Parliament. He was a strong supporter of the citizenship rights of the solely British ethnic minorities in Hong Kong, and fought for their rights.

In 1964 he sought a review of the Timothy Evans case. Evans was subsequently granted a posthumous pardon.

In recognition of his lifetime human rights work, Lubbock was made the inaugural recipient of the Ahmadiyya Muslim Peace Prize at the National Peace Symposium hosted at the Baitul Futuh Mosque in South London in 2009.

Writing for Travellers' Times, the writer and artist Damian Le Bas noted Avebury's 50-year commitment to improving the lives of the Gypsy, Roma, Traveller community in the UK, calling him "one of the greatest friends the Travellers ever had."

Avebury was a board member of the Gulf Center for Human Rights. Its chairperson, Maryam Alkhawaja, noted on his death that "Lord Eric Avebury supported Bahraini activists when no one else would, and continued to support the next generation of activists throughout the years. He died on the fifth anniversary of the Bahraini uprising, and I know that many of us will carry his memory with us throughout the struggle."

As a backbench Liberal Democrat peer in the House of Lords during the 2010–2015 parliament, he repeatedly voted against his own party on issues like the Bedroom Tax, which he opposed, and cuts to Legal Aid.

The Dictionary of Liberal Biography called Avebury "a scourge of tyrants in Central and South America, Asia and Africa", noting that he had been detained twice while pursuing human rights causes in Sri Lanka and Guyana.

Maurice Lubbock Memorial Fund
Trained as an engineer, Lord Avebury retained an interest in science and engineering. Together with his mother in 1957, he set up the Maurice Lubbock Memorial Fund to commemorate his father, following his early death. This established a Trust, which he chaired for 56 years, aimed at supporting Engineering and Management at Balliol College, Oxford. The Trust is still active and is one of the longest lasting of such ventures. He was elected to an Honorary Fellowship at Balliol College in 2004.

Conservation Society 
Lubbock was the President of the Conservation Society from 1972 to 1984. During his presidency, he proposed a form of words to introduce the concept of 'sustainable development' into Article 2 of the Treaty of Rome in a letter to The Times of 20 January 1975. This contributed to the successful debate on changing the wording of Article 2 to include a reference to sustainable development.

Private life
He married twice:
 Kina-Maria O'Kelly de Gallagh (2 September 1953 – 1983)
 Lyulph Ambrose Jonathan Lubbock, 5th Baron Avebury (born 15 June 1954); married Susan MacDonald 14 May 1977, with issue.
 Maurice Patrick Guy Lubbock (born 5 November 1955); married Diana Tobin 1982 with issue.
 Victoria Sarah Maria Lubbock (born 27 April 1959); married Alan Binnie 1983 with issue.
 Lindsay Stewart (1985–2016)
 John William Stewart Lubbock (born 8 August 1985)
Lord Avebury lived in Camberwell, London. He was an atheist and humanist; he was both a member of the All Party Parliamentary Humanist Group and a patron of the British Humanist Association. He reconciled his humanist beliefs with Buddhism, and lived as a secular Buddhist. He died in London on 14 February 2016 from myelofibrosis. He is buried near St. Giles Church, Farnborough near Orpington, Kent.

References

External links

 Lord Avebury profile at the site of the Liberal Democrats
 Lord Avebury's personal blog
 On BN(O) minors of Nepalese origin entitled to British citizenship, 4 July 2006 letter to the South China Morning Post
 Highlighting the plight of Indian ethnic minority BN(O)s in Limbo in Hong Kong, 25 September 2006 letter to the South China Morning Post
 Criticising the delay in processing of British citizenship applications of Indian-origin ethnic minorities in Hong Kong, 23 October 2006 letter to the South China Morning Post
 On persons of Indian & Nepalese origin born in Hong Kong before 30 June 1979 and 30 June 1976 entitled to British nationality, 27 November 2006 letter to the South China Morning Post
 On difficulties facing British nationals of Nepalese origin entitled to British citizenship, 22 February 2007 letter to the South China Morning Post
 Speech at Committee Stage of the Borders, Citizenship and Immigration Bill 2009 advocating that solely British Nationals (Overseas) be given a right to register as British citizens
 Video of Committee Stage of the Borders, Citizenship and Immigration Bill 2009 advocating that solely British Nationals (Overseas) be given a right to register as British citizens
 Britain must resolve issue of stateless people, letter in the South China Morning Post 14 March 2009
 Eric Avebury publications archive

1928 births
2016 deaths
Burials in Kent
Alumni of Balliol College, Oxford
Eric
British secularists
Lubbock
Deaths from cancer in England
Deaths from leukemia
English Buddhists
English human rights activists
English humanists
Fellows of Balliol College, Oxford
Liberal Democrats (UK) hereditary peers
Liberal Party (UK) MPs for English constituencies
Eric
People educated at Harrow School
Military personnel from Kent
Lubbock, Eric
Lubbock, Eric
Lubbock, Eric
UK MPs who inherited peerages
Upper Canada College alumni
Welsh Guards officers
Hereditary peers elected under the House of Lords Act 1999
Recipients of the Ahmadiyya Muslim Peace Prize